The Raleigh Rebels were a professional indoor football team based out of Raleigh, North Carolina. They played their home games at the Dorton Arena and were members of the American Indoor Football League (AIFL).

During the team's inaugural season, they played an all-road schedule as a favor to the league (the Ghostriders were also playing an all-road schedule, since they were a quick formation of the Carolina Sharks), along with the fact that they couldn't get a lease for an arena in Raleigh until 2006. During their first year, the Rebels compiled a mediocre record of 3-7, almost beating the Canton Legends for fourth place. Since the league had only six teams, everyone of them (including the Rebels) made the playoffs. Their inaugural year ended with a thud as they lost in the first round to the Legends.

The Rebels' second year turned out to be better than their inaugural year.  They finished the regular season at 8-6 and automatically went to the Southern Conference championship game, due to the Richmond Bandits' suspension, making them forfeit. However, a week's worth of rest couldn't prepare them for the top-seeded Rome Renegades, as they fell 63-14.

Following their AIFL playoff loss, the Rebels announced their intentions to move to the WIFL with the Rome Renegades.  They would have become charters member of this newly formed league.  Despite changing their name to the Carolina Bombers on August 24, they would never have a chance to play in the new league, because on October 16, they ceased all operations, along with the Rome Renegades.

Season-By-Season 

|-
| colspan="6" align="center" | Raleigh Rebels (AIFL)
|-
|2005 || 3 || 7 || 0 || 5th League || Lost First Round (Canton)
|-
|2006 || 8 || 6 || 0 || 3rd Southern || Lost SC Championship (Rome)
|-
!Totals || 12 || 15 || 0
|colspan="2"| (including playoffs)

References

External links
 Official Site of the Carolina Bombers (under construction)
 Rebels' 2005 AIFL Stats
 Rebels' 2006 AIFL Season & Results

American football teams in North Carolina
American Indoor Football Association teams
American Indoor Football League teams
World Indoor Football League (2007) teams
Sports in Raleigh, North Carolina
American football teams established in 2005
American football teams disestablished in 2006
2005 establishments in North Carolina
2006 disestablishments in North Carolina